Jatli is a chief town in Tehsil Gujar Khan Pothohar, Pakistan. Jatli is also chief town of Union Council Jatli which is an administrative subdivision of the Tehsil.

History
The foundation of Jatli was laid by a person named Jatal.  It was later awarded to Rai Dalla as a gift for his bravery.  After then Raja Maher Muhammad took the possession of this land.

Generation of Jatli
Jatli is mainly held by Suryavanshi Thathaal Rajputs and origin is Kashmir as they are descendants of Raja Karan (ruler of Kashmir) and further took over by his son Raja Thathu who first converted to Islam. They were expelled/displaced from their native place during Mughal regime in 16th century. Raja Thathu's offspring namely Muhabbat Khan, Akber Khan and their sister came to Jatli during Mughal regime and made their home at a central spot under a big ’Pepal’ tree.

References

History of Jatli

Populated places in Gujar Khan Tehsil
Union councils of Gujar Khan Tehsil